Dargal Road is a rural locality in the Maranoa Region, Queensland, Australia.

Geography 
The locality is bounded to the south by the Warrego Highway and Western railway line, by Bungeworgorai Creek to the west, and by Richardson Lane to the east. The land is predominantly used for cattle grazing.

The locality presumably takes its name from the road of the same name which traverses the locality from the north-east (Roma) to the north-west (Bungeworgorai).

Education 
There are no schools in the locality. The nearest primary and secondary school is Roma State College in Roma to the east.

References 

Maranoa Region
Localities in Queensland